Thomas Bayley was an English  academic.

Bayley was educated at Magdalen College, Oxford, of which college he was a Fellow from 1664  to 1689. He was  Magdalen's President from 1703 until his death on 15 August 1706. He held livings at Fordham and Slimbridge.

References

1706 deaths
Alumni of Magdalen College, Oxford
Fellows of Magdalen College, Oxford
Presidents of Magdalen College, Oxford